Schlosstheater Schwetzingen (Schwetzingen palace theater) is a court theater in Schwetzingen, Baden-Württemberg, Germany. The historic building, opened in 1753, is part of Schloss Schwetzingen and since 1952 the principal venue of the Schwetzingen Festival. It is also called Hoftheater (court theater), Hofoper (court opera), and Comoedienhaus (comedy house). The frequently applied name Rokokotheater (Rococo theater) is misleading, because it shows also neoclassical elements, added in 1762.

History 

Karl Theodor, the Pfalzgraf who resided in Mannheim, had the theater built for his summer residence in Schwetzingen in 1752 to the plans of court architect Nicolas de Pigage. It was opened on 15 June 1753, presenting Ignaz Holzbauer's opera Il figlio delle selve. The theater could then be considered a rococo creation, but was expanded with early neoclassical tendencies. While it first had no boxes, it was enlarged in 1762, creating a "box-like" impression. It is the oldest surviving Rangtheater (theater with boxless tiers) in Europe. The Mozart family visited the theater in 1763 and saw a play. When Karl Theodor succeeded Maximilian III Joseph of Bavaria as Elector of Bavaria in 1777, the court had to move to Munich and the theater lost its importance. Its original stage machinery was preserved into the 20th century, but it was replaced by modern facilities in the 1950s and again in the 1970s.

As part of the Residenz in the Schwetzingen Castle, it first belonged to the Electors, later to the Land Baden, then the state Baden-Württemberg.

Performances 
The theater is a fitting location for operas and plays from the Baroque and classical period. Voltaire's  L'orphelin de la Chine was premiered in 1755, his tragedy Olimpie was premiered in 1762, staged by Cosimo Alessandro Collini (1727–1806). Francesca Lebrun, the sister of Franz Danzi, a leading singer of the Mannheim Opera, performed, for example, the part of Parthenia in Anton Schweitzer's Alceste in Schwetzingen in 1775.

Schwetzingen Festival 

Since 1952 the theater has been the main venue of the Schwetzinger Festspiele (Schwetzingen Festival), which also presents contemporary operas. More than 35 operas have been commissioned and premiered, including works by Hans Werner Henze, Werner Egk, Udo Zimmermann, Aribert Reimann, Salvatore Sciarrino, Adriana Hölszky, Bernhard Lang, Wolfgang Rihm, Michael Jarrell, Georg Friedrich Haas and Enno Poppe.

Premieres have included
 Werner Egk: Der Revisor (9 May 1957)
 Gerhard Wimberger: La Battaglia (12 May 1960)
 Hans Werner Henze: Elegie für junge Liebende (20 May 1961)
 Wolfgang Fortner: In seinem Garten liebt Don Perlimplin Belisa (10 May 1962)
 Boris Blacher: Demeter, ballet (1964) 
 Bernd Alois Zimmermann: Présence, ballet (1968)
 Giselher Klebe: Das Märchen von der schönen Lilie (15 May 1969)
 Aribert Reimann: Melusine (29 Apr 1971)
 Arne Nordheim: The Tempest, ballet (1979)
 Hans Werner Henze: Pollicino (1981)
 Udo Zimmermann: Die wundersame Schustersfrau (1982)
 Hans Werner Henze: Die englische Katze (2 June 1983)
 Rudolf Kelterborn: Ophelia (1984)
 Hans-Jürgen von Bose: Die Leiden des jungen Werthers (1 May 1986)
 Rolf Liebermann: Der Wald (1988)
 Georg Katzer: Gastmahl oder Über die Liebe (1988)
 Manfred Trojahn: Enrico (11 Apr 1991)
 Helge Jörns: Spiel von Liebefall (1991)
 Eckehard Mayer: Sansibar (1994) 
 Violeta Dinescu: Schachnovelle (1994)
 Hans Werner Henze: Tanzstunden (1997)
 Detlef Heusinger: Babylon (1997)
 Salvatore Sciarrino: Luci mie traditrici (19 May 1998)
 Karl Wieland Kurz: Gute Miene böses Spiel (2000)
 : Bacon (2001)
 Salvatore Sciarrino: Macbeth (6 June 2002), Premiere of the Year
 Frederik Zeller: Zaubern (2005)
 Salvatore Sciarrino: Da gelo a gelo (21 May 2006)
 Bernhard Lang: Der Alte vom Berge (2007)
 Adriana Hölszky:Hybris/Niobe, Drama für Stimmen (2008) 
 Wolfgang Rihm: Proserpina, Monodram für Sopran, Frauenchor und Orchester (2009),
 Michael Jarrell: Le Père, Musiktheater (2010) 
 Georg Friedrich Haas: Bluthaus (2011)
 Enno Poppe: IQ (2012) 
 Georg Friedrich Haas: Thomas (2013) 
 Bernhard Lang:  (2014)
 Hèctor Parra: Wilde (2015) 
 Georg Friedrich Haas: Koma (2016), Premiere of the Year
 Annette Schlünz: Tre Volti – Drei Blicke auf Liebe und Krieg, Musiktheater (2017)
 José María Sánchez-Verdú: , Dramma in musica (2018) 
 Elena Mendoza: Der Fall Babel, Musiktheater (2019)

Each year the festival has presented the revival of a Baroque or classical opera. Holzbauer's Il figlio delle selve, which had opened the theater in 1753, was performed 250 years later in 2003.

Mozartfest 
From 1969 the theater has been a venue of the Mozartfest, an annual festival in fall organized by the association Mozartgesellschaft Schwetzingen.

Literature 
 Silke Leopold, Bärbel Pelker (ed.): Hofoper in Schwetzingen. Musik, Bühnenkunst, Architektur. Universitätsverlag Winter, Heidelberg 2004, 
 Rolf Dieter Opel: Wolfgang Amadeus Mozart in Schwetzingen und Mannheim. 3rd edition. Universitätsverlag Winter, Heidelberg 2006, 
 Hans Joachim Scholderer: Schlosstheater Ludwigsburg. ed. Finanzministerium Baden-Württemberg. Stuttgart 1998

References

External links 

 Schloss Schwetzingen schloss-schwetzingen.de (Schlösserverwaltung Baden-Württemberg)
 Schwetzingen: Rokokotheater andreas-praefcke.de
 Schwetzinger Mozartfest Schwetzingen 2011 
 Acoustics of a selection of famous 18th-century opera houses: Versailles, Markgräfliches Opernhaus, Drottningholm, Schwetzingen Arup Acoustics 2008

Theatres in Baden-Württemberg
Theatres completed in 1752
Buildings and structures in Rhein-Neckar-Kreis